Sahra Wagenknecht (born Sarah Wagenknecht; ; 16 July 1969) is a German politician, economist, author and publicist. Since 2009, she has been a member of the Bundestag for The Left. From 2015 to 2019 she served as parliamentary co-chair of her party.

Wagenknecht became a prominent member of the Party of Democratic Socialism (PDS) from the early 1990s. After the foundation of The Left, she became a leading member of the party's most radical wing as leader of the Communist Platform. She has been a controversial figure throughout her career due to her hardline and populist stances, statements about East Germany, immigration and refugees, and her political movement Aufstehen.

Early life 
Wagenknecht was born on 16 July 1969 in the East German city of Jena. Her father is Iranian and her mother, who worked for a state-run art distributor, is German. Her father disappeared in Iran when she was a child. She was cared for primarily by her grandparents until 1976, when she and her mother moved to East Berlin. While in Berlin, she became a member of the Free German Youth (FDJ). She completed her Abitur exams in 1988 and joined the (then ruling) Socialist Unity Party (SED) in early 1989.

From 1990, Wagenknecht studied philosophy and New German Literature as an undergraduate in Jena and Berlin, completing mandatory coursework, but did not write a thesis as she "could not find support for her research aims at the East Berlin Humboldt University". She then enrolled as a philosophy student at the University of Groningen, completing her studies and earning an MA in 1996 for a thesis on the young Karl Marx's interpretation of Hegel, supervised by Hans Heinz Holz and published as a book in 1997. From 2005 until 2012 she completed a PhD dissertation at the chair of Microeconomics at TU Chemnitz, on "The Limits of Choice: Saving Decisions and Basic Needs in Developed Countries", awarded with the grade magna cum laude in the German system and subsequently published by the Campus Verlag.

Political career 
After the fall of the Berlin Wall and the transformation of the SED into the Party of Democratic Socialism (PDS), Wagenknecht was elected to the new party's National Committee in 1991. She also joined the PDS's Communist Platform, a Marxist-Leninist faction.

In the 1998 German federal election, Wagenknecht ran as the PDS candidate in a district of Dortmund, garnering 3.25% of the vote. Following the 2004 European elections, she was elected as a PDS representative to the European Parliament. Among her duties in the parliament is serving on the Committee on Economic and Monetary Affairs and Delegation, as well as the Euro-Latin American Parliamentary Assembly.

Following the merger of the PDS and the WASG that formed the Left Party (Die Linke), Wagenknecht considered campaigning for the position of party vice-chair. However, party leaders such as Lothar Bisky and Gregor Gysi objected to the idea primarily because of her perceived sympathies for the former German Democratic Republic (GDR or East Germany). Following the controversy, she announced that she would not run for the post. Wagenknecht successfully contested a seat in the 2009 federal election in North Rhine-Westphalia. She became the Left Party's spokesperson for economic politics in the Bundestag. On 15 May 2010, she was at last elected vice-president of the Left Party with 75.3% of the vote.

Early in 2012, the German press reported that Wagenknecht was one of 27 Left Party Bundestag members whose writings and speeches were being collected and analyzed by the Federal Office for the Protection of the Constitution.

She has been one of the main driving forces in the formation of Aufstehen, a left-wing political movement established in 2018, which exists outside of traditional political party structures and has been compared to the French movement La France Insoumise. In March 2019, Wagenknecht announced her withdrawal from her leadership role within Aufstehen, citing personal workload pressures and insisting that after a successful start-up phase, for which political experience was necessary, the time had come for the movement's own grass roots to assume control. She complained that the involvement of political parties at its heart had "walled in" ("sich eingemauert") the movement. She would nonetheless continue to make public appearances on its behalf.

Wagenknecht was elected co-leader of the Left's Bundestag group in 2015 alongside Dietmar Bartsch succeeding long-time leader Gregor Gysi. Wagenknecht won 78.4% of votes cast. As the Left was at the time the largest opposition party in the Bundestag, she became a prominent leader of the opposition for the remainder of the parliamentary term. Bartsch and Wagenknecht were the Left's lead candidates for the 2017 federal election.

In November 2019, she announced her resignation as parliamentary leader, citing burnout.

Wagenknecht was again nominated as the lead candidate on the party's North Rhine-Westphalia list in the 2021 federal election. She was re-elected, but described the results as a "bitter defeat" for her party.

Political views

Economic policy 
Wagenknecht has argued that the Left Party must pursue radical and anti-capitalist goals, thereby remaining distinct from the more moderate Social Democratic Party (SPD) and Green Party. She has criticized the Left Party's participation in coalition governments, especially the Berlin state government, which has made cuts to social spending and privatized some services.

On 14 February 2014, the German business and economics newspaper Handelsblatt put her on the cover of its weekend edition, wondering whether the left really was better at understanding economics: "Sind die Linken die besseren Wirtschaftsversteher?" The ambiguous headline made it unclear whether the question referred to left-wingers in general or to Wagenknecht's party, The Left, in particular. The newspaper had earlier interviewed her about her ideas about liberalism and socialism.

Foreign policy 
In 2017, Wagenknecht called for the dissolution of NATO and for a new security agreement that links Germany and Russia. Throughout her career, Wagenknecht has argued in favor of a closer relationship with Russia. In 1992, she had published an essay praising Stalinist Russia, a view she said in 2017 she no longer espoused.

Wagenknecht has expressed strong support for the rise of left-wing leaders in Latin America, such as Hugo Chávez, and for SYRIZA's 2015 electoral victory in Greece. She serves as a spokesperson for the Venezuela Avanza solidarity network, and as an alternate on the European Parliament's delegation for relations with Mercosur.

In 2010, she refused to join a standing ovation when former Israeli Prime Minister and Nobel Laureate Shimon Peres gave a speech in the Bundestag on Holocaust Remembrance Day.

Russian invasion of Ukraine 
In the lead-up to Russia's invasion of Ukraine, Wagenknecht was a prominent defender of Russia and its President Vladimir Putin, arguing on February 20, 2022 that while the United States was trying to "conjure up" an invasion of Ukraine, "“Russia has in fact no interest to march into Ukraine.” After Russia launched a large-scale invasion of Ukraine on February 24, 2022, Wagenknecht admitted that her judgment had been wrong. 
Wagenknecht opposed sanctions against Russia over the 2022 Russian invasion of Ukraine, and, in a speech in September 2022, accused the German government of "launching an unprecedented economic war against our most important energy supplier". Before the war, over half of Germany's gas was supplied by Russia. In May, The Left had voted in favor of economic sanctions against Russia. Her speech was applauded by The Left party leadership and by the far-right Alternative for Germany. Her speech prompted the resignation of two high profile party members.

On February 10, 2023, Wagenknecht and Alice Schwarzer had started collecting signatures for a "peace manifesto", signed by more than 700,000 people at the end of the month, entitled Manifest für Frieden ("Manifest for Peace)" on Change.org, demanding negotiations with Russia and a stop of weapon deliveries to Ukraine. A rally with Wagenknecht and Schwarzer on February 25 was widely criticized, especially because far right groups attended, suggesting an appeal to the Querfront.

Refugee policy 
In response to the 2015 Cologne sexual attacks, Wagenknecht stated "Whoever abuses his right to hospitality has forfeited his right to hospitality". This statement was almost unanimously criticized in her party and parliamentary group colleagues, but did receive praise from some in the AfD.

On 28 May 2016, an activist from the anti-fascist group Torten für Menschenfeinde ("Cakes for Enemies of Humanity") pushed a chocolate cake in Wagenknecht's face at a Left Party meeting in Magdeburg in response to Wagenknecht's calls for limits on the number of refugees. Wagenknecht has criticised Angela Merkel's refugee policies, arguing that her government has not provided the levels of financial and infrastructural support required to avoid increasing pressure on local authorities and the labour market, thereby exacerbating tensions in society. She has also claimed that Merkel's policies were partly to blame for the 2016 Berlin truck attack.

Partly in response to these experiences, in 2021, she published the book "Die Selbstgerechten" ("The Self-Righteous") in which she criticises so-called "left-liberals" ("Linksliberale") for being neither left nor liberal but rather supporting the ruling classes' and, to some extent, their own interests. The book features, among several other topics, a discussion on immigration's alleged negative impacts on the domestic working class. It reached number one in the German non-fiction bestseller-list as published by Der Spiegel.

COVID-19
Regarding the COVID-19 pandemic, Wagenknecht has opined that only the elderly and vulnerable groups need to be vaccinated against the disease, and agitated against the German government response to the COVID-19 pandemic. Her positions have been compared to those of the far-right Alternative for Germany. In November 2021, party colleagues such as Maximilian Becker, Martina Renner, and Niema Movassat suggested that Wagenknecht leave the party.

Personal life 
Wagenknecht married businessman Ralph-Thomas Niemeyer in May 1997. However, on 12 November 2011, politician Oskar Lafontaine stated publicly that he and Wagenknecht had become "close friends" (German: eng befreundet). At the time, Wagenknecht and Lafontaine had already separated from their respective spouses. Wagenknecht married Lafontaine, 26 years her senior, on 22 December 2014. She is an atheist.

Books 
 Kapitalismus im Koma: Eine sozialistische Diagnose. ("Capitalism in a coma: A socialist diagnosis.") Edition Ost, Berlin 2003, .
 Die Mythen der Modernisierer. ("The myths of the modernizers.") Dingsda, Querfurt 2001, .
 Kapital, Crash, Krise… Kein Ausweg in Sicht? Fragen an Sahra Wagenknecht. ("Capital, crash, crisis… No way out in sight? Questions to Sahra Wagenknecht.") Pahl-Rugenstein, Bonn 1998, .
 The Limits of Choice. Saving Decisions and Basic Needs in Developed Countries. Campus, Frankfurt am Main 2013, . (Also doctoral dissertation at the Technische Universität Chemnitz in 2012.)
 Kapitalismus, was tun? Schriften zur Krise. ("Capitalism, what to do? Writings about the crisis.") Das Neue Berlin, Berlin 2013, .
 Freiheit statt Kapitalismus: Über vergessene Ideale, die Eurokrise und unsere Zukunft. ("Freedom instead of capitalism: About forgotten ideals, the Euro crisis, and our future.") 2., erweiterte Auflage, Campus, Frankfurt am Main 2012, ; ungekürzte Taschenbuchausgabe: dtv, München 2013, .
 Freiheit statt Kapitalismus: Wie wir zu mehr Arbeit, Innovation und Gerechtigkeit kommen. ("Freedom instead of capitalism: How we will achieve more work, innovation, and justice.") Eichborn, Berlin 2011, .
 Wahnsinn mit Methode: Finanzkrise und Weltwirtschaft. ("Methodical madness: Financial crisis and global economy.") Das Neue Berlin, Berlin 2008, .
 Reichtum ohne Gier: Wie wir uns vor dem Kapitalismus retten. ("Wealth without Greed: how we save ourselves from capitalism.") Campus, Frankfurt am Main 2016, .
 Die Selbstgerechten: Mein Gegenprogramm – für Gemeinsinn und Zusammenhalt. ("The self-righteous: my counter-scheme – for public spirit and social cohesion.") Campus, Frankfurt am Main 2021, .

References

External links 

  Official website
  European Parliament profile
  Wagenknecht criticizes Merkel for serving US interests to detriment of EU population/economy 26.11 with English subtitles, 26 November 2014
  Video of Wagenknecht interview on The Real News Network, 26 September 2012
  Left Party profile
  Video of Wagenknecht at 2008 Left Party Congress at YouTube

1969 births
Living people
Politicians from Jena
People from Bezirk Gera
German politicians of Iranian descent
Members of the Bundestag for North Rhine-Westphalia
The Left (Germany) MEPs
MEPs for Germany 2004–2009
21st-century women MEPs for Germany
German atheists
German communists
Aufstehen
Female members of the Bundestag
Members of the Bundestag 2017–2021
Members of the Bundestag 2013–2017
Members of the Bundestag 2009–2013
Members of the Bundestag for The Left
Socialist Unity Party of Germany members
Chemnitz University of Technology alumni
University of Groningen alumni
Members of the Bundestag 2021–2025
Politicians affected by a party expulsion process
Critics of multiculturalism
Women opposition leaders
21st-century German women politicians